Schistura sijuensis is a troglobitic species of stone loach endemic to India.

It is only recorded from Siju cave in the Garo Hills of Meghalaya state, Northeast India.

References

Sources

S
Cyprinid fish of Asia
Endemic fauna of India
Freshwater fish of India
Cave fish
Meghalaya
Vulnerable fauna of Asia
Fish described in 1987
Taxonomy articles created by Polbot